Sonam Tenzin (born 20 October 1986) is a football player from Bhutan. He plays as forward for Druk Pol, having previously played in the Indian 3rd division for Buddhist Blue Stars. He is also a member of the Bhutanese national team.

Career statistics

International goals

References

External links
 

1986 births
Living people
Association football forwards
Bhutanese footballers
Bhutan international footballers
Druk Pol F.C. players
Bhutanese expatriate footballers
Bhutanese expatriate sportspeople in India
People from Thimphu